The following is a list of episodes for the Hawaiian Eye detective series. The American television series ran on the American Broadcasting Company 1959–1963. 

Private investigator Tracy Steele (Anthony Eisley) and his half-Hawaiian partner, Tom Lopaka (Robert Conrad), own Hawaiian Eye, a combination detective agency and private security firm, located in Honolulu, Hawaii. Their principal client is the Hawaiian Village Hotel, which in exchange for security services, provides the agency with a luxurious private compound on the hotel grounds.

The partners investigate mysteries and protect clients with the sometime help of photographer Cricket Blake (Connie Stevens), who also sings at the hotel's Shell Bar, and a ukulele-playing cab driver Kim Quisado (Poncie Ponce), who has "relatives" throughout the islands.  Engineer turned detective Greg McKenzie (Grant Williams), joins the agency later on as a full partner, while hotel social director Philip Barton (Troy Donahue) lends a hand after Tracy Steele departs.

Series overview

Episodes

Season 1 (1959–60)

Season 2 (1960–61)

Season 3 (1961–62)

Season 4 (1962–63)

References

External links

 

Hawaiian Eye
Hawaiian Eye episodes